Andrew Nagorski is an American journalist and author who spent more than three decades as a foreign correspondent and editor for Newsweek. From 2008 to April 2014, he was vice-president and director of public policy for the EastWest Institute, an international affairs think tank. Nagorski is based in  St. Augustine, Florida. He continues to travel extensively, writing for numerous publications. His most recent book is Saving Freud: The Rescuers Who Brought Him to Freedom (Simon & Schuster), which came out in August 2022.

Early life
Born in 1947 in Edinburgh, Scotland of Polish parents, Zygmunt Witold Nagorski Jr. and Maria Bogdaszewska (who emigrated to the United States in 1948), he attended school overseas while his father was in the United States Foreign Service. 
He earned a BA magna cum laude and Phi Beta Kappa from Amherst College in 1969, and studied at the Jagiellonian University in Cracow. Nagorski taught social studies at Wayland High School in Massachusetts before joining Newsweek.

News reporting
After joining Newsweek International in 1973 as an associate editor, he was its assistant managing editor from 1977 to 1978. From 1978 to 1980, Nagorski was the Hong Kong-based Asian regional editor for Newsweek International and then as Hong Kong Bureau Chief.

From 1990 to 1994, he served as Newsweek's Warsaw bureau chief, and he has served two tours of duty as Newsweek's Moscow bureau chief, first in the early 1980s and then from 1995 to 1996. In 1982, he gained international notoriety when the Soviet government, angry about his enterprising reporting, expelled him from the country. After spending the next two and a half years as Rome bureau chief, he became Bonn bureau chief.

As Berlin bureau chief from 1996 to 1999, Nagorski provided in-depth reporting about Germany's efforts to overcome the legacy of division, the immigration debate, and German-Jewish relations. From Berlin, Nagorski also covered Central Europe, taking advantage of his long experience in the region and his knowledge of Polish, Russian, German and French.

Nagorski was in New York as a senior editor for Newsweek from January 2000 till 2008, after serving as a foreign correspondent and bureau chief for Newsweek in Hong Kong, Moscow, Rome, Bonn, Warsaw and Berlin. Nagorski developed the editorial co-operation between Newsweek International and its network of foreign language editions and other joint venture partners. The most recent additions have been Newsweek Russia, which was launched in June 2004, and Newsweek Polska. Nagorski was at the EastWest Institute as Vice-President and Director of Public Policy.  Nagorski also continues to write reviews and commentaries for Newsweek International. He has been honoured three times by the Overseas Press Club for his reporting.

In 2009, Poland's Foreign Minister Radoslaw Sikorski presented Nagorski with the newly created Bene Merito award for his reporting from Poland about the Solidarity movement in the 1980s. In 2011, Poland's President Bronislaw Komorowski awarded him the Cavalry Cross for the same reason. In 2014, Poland's former President and Solidarity leader Lech Walesa presented the "Lech Walesa Media Award" to Nagorski "for dedication to the cause of freedom and writing about Poland's history and culture." In January 2023, Nagorski joined the International Editorial and Advisory Board of the Israel Council on Foreign Relations.

Author

Non-fiction
 Reluctant Farewell: An American Reporter’s Candid Look Inside the Soviet Union, New Republic/Henry Holt, 1985 
 The Birth of Freedom: Shaping Lives and Societies in the New Eastern Europe, Simon & Schuster, 1993 
 The Greatest Battle: Stalin, Hitler and the Desperate Struggle for Moscow That Changed the Course of World War II, Simon & Schuster, 2007
 Hitlerland: American Eyewitnesses to the Nazi Rise to Power, Simon & Schuster, 2012
 The Nazi Hunters, Simon & Schuster, 2016
 1941: The Year Germany Lost the War, Simon & Schuster, 2019
 "Saving Freud: The Rescuers Who Brought Him to Freedom", Simon & Schuster, 2022

The Greatest Battle was named a 2007 Los Angeles Times Book Prize Finalist and "one of the best books of 2007" by The Washington Post.  

Hitlerland: American Eyewitnesses to the Nazi Rise to Power (2012) received glowing reviews from numerous publications. The Chicago Tribune called it "riveting... an important, chilling book." 

The Washington Post called The Nazi Hunters a "deep and sweeping account of a relentless search for justice that began in 1945 and is only now coming to an end."

Fiction
Nagorski's first novel, Last Stop Vienna, about a young German who joins the early Nazi movement and then is propelled into a confrontation with Hitler, was published by Simon & Schuster in January 2003. Called a "fast-moving, riveting debut novel" by Publishers Weekly, it appeared on The Washington Post best-seller list.

Other roles
In 1988, Nagorski took a one-year leave of absence to serve as a senior associate at the Carnegie Endowment for International Peace think tank in Washington, D.C. He has also served as an adjunct professor at the Bard College Center for Globalization and International Affairs, teaching a course on international affairs writing.  He is chairman of the board of the Polish-American Freedom Foundation, and a member of the Council of Foreign Relations and the Overseas Press Club.

Nagorski and his wife, Christina, have four children: Eva, Sonia, Adam and Alex.

References

External links
 
WW2DB: Review of Nagorski's The Greatest Battle

 https://web.archive.org/web/20110822153355/http://www.ewi.info/andrew-nagorski

1947 births
Living people
American male journalists
American magazine editors
Amherst College alumni
Writers from Edinburgh
British people of Polish descent
British emigrants to the United States
Scottish people of Polish descent
Nothing in Nagorski book on Freud and the Nazis in Vienna offers anything more than a couple of chapters in Peter Gay's find biography of Freud.